Fireside Favourites is the debut studio album by Fad Gadget. It was released on 7 November 1980, through record label Mute.

Background 

The music developed the primitive industrial sound of his first recordings, the singles "Back to Nature" (1979) and "Ricky's Hand" (1980). Realised with an expanded array of collaborators, including a number of notable record producers, the album's instrumentation combined the synthesizers, drum machines and found objects of previous releases with conventional guitar, bass and percussion. The lyrics and subject matter ridiculed various aspects of modern society and featured observations from sometimes bizarre perspectives.

The opening track, "Pedestrian", was a commentary on society's obsession with the automobile. It segued into "State of the Nation", whose chorus declared that "Life begins when you're ready to face it". "Salt Lake City Sunday" satirized the Church of Jesus Christ of Latter-day Saints, from its practice of tithing ("They want you to repent/They want your ten per cent") to its belief in conversion of the deceased ("You leave my ancestors to rot in their graves"). "Coitus Interruptus" described the vacuousness of modern relationships ("The boys sleep with girls/The boys sleep with boys/Never find that high/Never acting coy") with deadpan puns ("Emission impossible"). The jaunty title track and then-current single, "Fireside Favourite", juxtaposed sexual conquest with nuclear nightmare imagery ("Hey now honey, open your eyes/There's a mushroom cloud up in the sky/Your hair is falling out and your teeth have gone/Your legs are still together but it won't be long").

"Newsreel" parodied all-pervading news reportage ("Put the mike into the mouth of the wound/Tape the sound of fading life/Edit out the sounds that displease/Ask the feelings of a dead man's wife"). "Insecticide", also released as the B-side of "Fireside Favourite", was narrated from a fly's point of view ("I creep up the wall/And then across the ceiling/I spin round the bulb/And land on a sandwich"). "The Box", a re-recording of the B-side of Fad Gadget's debut single "Back to Nature", concerned premature burial. The closing track, "Arch of the Aorta", was a largely instrumental piece with looped background voices depicting conversation between medical staff and a patient.

Release 

Fireside Favourites was released on 7 November 1980. It did not make the mainstream charts.

Track listing

Personnel 

 Fad Gadget – voice synthesizer, tapes, drum machine, ashtray, metal chair, electric shaver, studio

 Additional personnel

 Eric Radcliffe – guitar, bass, banjo, studio
 John Fryer – extra fingers, ashtray, metal chair, studio
 Nick Cash – drums
 Daniel Miller – electronic percussion (tracks 1 & 4), synthesizer, sequencer (tracks 4 & 8)
 Phil Wauquaire – bass synthesizer (track 1), bass guitar (track 6)
 Jean-Marc Lederman – synthesizer not in the mix

References

External links 

 

1980 debut albums
Fad Gadget albums
Mute Records albums
Albums produced by John Fryer (producer)
Albums produced by Daniel Miller (music producer)
Albums produced by Eric Radcliffe